Awash may refer to:

 Awash, Ethiopia, a town in Ethiopia
 Awash River, a river in Ethiopia
 Awash National Park, in Ethiopia
 Awash International Bank, in Ethiopia

See also 
 
 Avas, a hill of volcanic origin in Miskolc, Hungary
 Avaş, a village and municipality in the Yardymli District of Azerbaijan